Maryland Route 818 (MD 818) is a state highway in the U.S. state of Maryland.  Known as Main Street, the state highway runs  between two intersections with U.S. Route 113 (US 113) on the north and south sides of Berlin in Worcester County.  MD 818 is the original 1927 alignment of US 113 through Berlin.  The state highway was designated shortly after US 113's bypass of Berlin was completed in the late 1950s.

Route description

MD 818 begins at an intersection with US 113 (Worcester Highway) on the south side of Berlin.  Germantown Road continues as a county highway on the east side of the intersection.  MD 818 heads north through the town of Berlin as a two-lane undivided road, passing Worcester Preparatory School, Buckingham Elementary School, and the historic home Burley Manor.  The state highway enters the Berlin Commercial District, where the highway intersects MD 376 (Bay Street), MD 374 (Broad Street), and unsigned MD 375 (Commerce Street) in rapid succession, with MD 377 (Williams Street) accessed from MD 376 just to the east.  After passing the Calvin B. Taylor House Museum, MD 818 leaves the downtown area.  The state highway crosses the Snow Hill Line of the Maryland and Delaware Railroad at a rakish angle before intersecting MD 346 (Old Ocean City Boulevard) and leaving the town of Berlin.  MD 818 passes through farmland and intersects US 50 (Ocean Gateway).  The state highway continues north, crossing the railroad track again before reaching its northern terminus at US 113.  Georgetown Road continues as a county highway on the east side of the intersection.

History
Main Street was paved through Berlin by 1910 and designated part of US 113 in 1927.  US 113's bypass of Berlin was under construction by 1955 and completed in 1957.

Junction list

Auxiliary route
MD 818A is a  one-way ramp from southbound MD 818 to southbound US 113 at the southern junction with US 113 that follows the U.S. Highway's original alignment.

See also

References

External links

MDRoads: MD 818

818
Maryland Route 818
Berlin, Maryland